The shorthead sculpin (Cottus confusus) is a species of fish in the family Cottidae. It is found in the United States and Canada, inhabiting the Columbia River drainage in Washington, Oregon, Idaho, Montana, and British Columbia. It is also found in the Puget Sound drainage in Washington. It reaches a maximum length of 15.0 cm. It prefers rocky riffles of headwaters and creeks.

References

Cottus (fish)
Fish described in 1963